Marios Makrionitis, SJ (Greek: Μάριος Μακρυωνίτης; 8 October 1913 – 8 April 1959) was a Greek Jesuit prelate of the Catholic Church. He served as the Archbishop of Athens from 1953 until 1959, when he died from injuries caused by an automobile accident.

Biography 
He joined the Society of Jesus and was ordained to the priesthood on 15 July 1941. In 1952, he was appointed Apostolic Vicar of Thessaloniki.

Makrionitis was appointed Archbishop of Athens by Pope Pius XII on 11 March 1953. His episcopal consecration took place on 10 May 1953, with the Bishop of Santorini, Georges Xenopulos, serving as principal consecrator, and Archbishop Giovanni Francesco Filippucci and Bishop George Calavassy as co-consecrators. As archbishop, he held a Catholic Book Exhibition at the Athens Catholic Club, the first such event in Greek history.

On 8 April 1959, Makrionitis was severely injured in an automobile accident, and died later that day or in the early morning of April 9. He was succeeded as archbishop by Venediktos Printesis, a former parish priest.

Episcopal lineage 
 Cardinal Scipione Rebiba
 Cardinal Giulio Antonio Santorio (1566)
 Cardinal Girolamo Bernerio, OP (1586)
 Archbishop Galeazzo Sanvitale (1604)
 Cardinal Ludovico Ludovisi (1621)
 Cardinal Luigi Caetani (1622)
 Cardinal Ulderico Carpegna (1630)
 Cardinal Paluzzo Paluzzi Altieri degli Albertoni (1666)
 Pope Benedict XIII (1675)
 Pope Benedict XIV (1724)
 Pope Clement XIII (1743)
 Cardinal Marco Antonio Colonna (1762)
 Cardinal Hyacinthe Sigismond Gerdil, CRSP (1777)
 Cardinal Giulio Maria della Somaglia (1788)
 Cardinal Carlo Odescalchi, SJ (1823)
 Bishop Eugène de Mazenod, OMI (1832)
 Archbishop Joseph-Hippolyte Guibert, OMI (1842)
 Cardinal François-Marie-Benjamin Richard (1872)
 Cardinal Pietro Gasparri (1898)
 Archbishop Angelo Rotta (1922)
 Archbishop Giovanni Francesco Filippucci (1927)
 Bishop Georges Xenopulos, SJ (1947)
 Archbishop Marios Makrionitis, SJ (1953)

References 

1913 births
1959 deaths
20th-century Jesuits
20th-century Roman Catholic archbishops in Greece
Apostolic vicars
Burials in Athens
Greek Jesuits
Jesuit archbishops
Road incident deaths in Greece
Roman Catholic archbishops of Athens
People from Poseidonia